Two vessels of the United States Revenue Cutter Service have been named USRC Scammel:

, was a revenue cutter in service from 1791 to 1798
, was a 14-gun schooner commissioned in 1798, and transferred to the U.S. Navy  as USS Scammel, decommissioned and sold in 1801

Ships of the United States Revenue Cutter Service